Khamba Thoibi Jagoi (Khamba Thoibi Dance) is a folk dance form, originated from the Ancient Moirang kingdom of Manipur. It is performed by a male and a female participant, dedicated to Lord Thangjing, the presiding deity of Ancient Moirang.  

The dance form is believed to be first performed by Khuman Khamba and Moirang Thoibi, in the premise of the deity.

Related pages 

 Leima Jagoi

References

Other websites 

 http://www.e-pao.net/epGallery.asp?id=5&src=Arts_Dances/Manipuri_Dance_Gallery/KhambaThoibi201112
 https://steemit.com/photography/@kissormeetei/khamba-thoibi-dance-india-original-photos
 http://www.manipurtourism.gov.in/art-culture/ 
Dance
Dance in Asia
Pages with unreviewed translations
Meitei people
Dances of Manipur